Luke Donn Fleurs (born 3 March 2000) is a South African soccer player who plays as a defender for South African Premier Division side SuperSport United.

Club career
Fleurs was born in Cape Town. He is from Mitchells Plain but moved to Fish Hoek after signing for Ubuntu Cape Town's academy in 2013, at the age of 13. He made his National First Division debut aged 17, and made 18 league appearances in his first season of professional football.

He signed for South African Premier Division side SuperSport United on a long-term deal in summer 2018.

International career
He has represented South Africa at under-20 level.

References

Living people
2000 births
South African soccer players
Soccer players from Cape Town
Association football defenders
Ubuntu Cape Town F.C. players
SuperSport United F.C. players
South African Premier Division players
National First Division players
South Africa under-20 international soccer players
Footballers at the 2020 Summer Olympics
Olympic soccer players of South Africa